The 'history of science and technology in Argentina describes the fate of scientific policies and discoveries made in this country.

Argentina has a long tradition in scientific research that begins with the colonial universities of the Spanish Golden Age and the Jesuit scientists of the 16th and 17th centuries, continuing with the astronomers and naturalists of the nineteenth century, such as Florentino Ameghino. With the appearance of national universities of Córdoba (founded in 1613 and nationalized in 1854), Buenos Aires (1821), Littoral (1889), La Plata (1897) and Tucumán (1914), began the first efforts to systematize and formalize the scientific study.

During the post-war period, there was a transformation of the national scientific system. To a large extent due to the creation of CONICET, a body created in the image and likeness of the French CNRS, which is in charge of financing the human resources necessary for scientific research (scholarship holders and researchers). During this period, specific organizations were also created for research in agricultural technology (INTA), industrial (INTI), nuclear (CNEA), defense (CITIDEF) and space (CNIE, now CONAE ). At the provincial level, the Scientific Research Commission (CIC) of the province of Buenos Aires was created. Argentina has a long tradition of biomedical research and has earned three Nobel Prizes: Bernardo Houssay (1947, the first in Latin America), Luis Federico Leloir (1970), and César Milstein (1984).

This period of development of the scientific system ended abruptly in 1966 with an episode known as the Noche de los Bastones Largos that caused a brain drain to developed countries. The political and ideological persecution continued until the end of the last military dictatorship in 1983.
With the return of democracy, the institutional situation in science and technology organizations is normalized, which again passes into civilian hands, but the sector's budget is scarce. The government of Carlos Menem (1989–1999) produced new changes in the Argentine scientific system with the creation of the ANPCyT (1997), which absorbed the function of providing subsidies and credits that CONICET had until that time. During this period, vacancies in the scientific system were almost nil, generating a new brain drain, which would continue during the De la Rúa government (1999–2001) when the economic crisis came into play.

The governments of Néstor Kirchner (2003–2007) and Cristina Fernández de Kirchner (2007– 2015) began to call for researchers and fellows at CONICET and the repatriation of researchers through the Raíces Program. In 2007, the Ministry of Science, Technology and Productive Innovation (MinCyT) was created for the first time, dedicated to planning and coordinating the area. Until then, there was only the Secretary of Science and Technology with a subordinate status. The area's budget suffers significant cuts during the following government of Mauricio Macri (2015–2019) who culminated his action in science and technology with the abolition of the Ministry of Science, Technology and Productive Innovation and its demotion to the secretariat level. Access to CONICET for young researchers is again reduced, which causes a new brain drain. During Alberto Fernández's first year (2019–), the Ministry of Science, Technology and Productive Innovation was re-created, which continues to suffer, however, from significant budget deficits.

The main achievements during the 21st century have been in biotechnology, with the development of new transgenic varieties; nuclear technology, where the country has exported reactors to different countries through the state company INVAP; and satellite technology which were designed and built satellites: SAC-D / Aquarius (2011), Arsat-1 (2014), SAOCOM 1-A (2018) and 1B (2020). Promotion programs are also developed in areas considered strategic by the national state, such as informatics, nanotechnology and biotechnology.

See also

 History of Argentina
 Science and technology in Argentina

References

External links

 Artículos sobre Historia de la Ciencia, por César Lorenzano, Director de la Maestría y Doctorado en Epistemología e Historia de la Ciencia (in Spanish)
 Enciclopedia de las ciencias y tecnologías en Argentina, Wiki-Encyclopedia in constant evolution with contributions from qualified scientists and technologists. (in Spanish)

Science and technology
Science and technology in Argentina